Caio Fernando de Oliveira (born 11 May 1998), known as Caio Paulista, is a Brazilian footballer who plays as a winger for São Paulo, on loan from Fluminense.

Club career
Born in São Paulo, Caio represented Ceará before joining Avaí's youth categories in 2017. He made his senior debut on 8 March 2018, coming on as a second-half substitute in a 1–0 Campeonato Catarinense away loss against Hercílio Luz; he only featured in one further match during the campaign, as his side achieved promotion to the Série A.

Promoted to the main squad ahead of the 2019 season, Caio made his top tier debut on 19 May of that year by starting in a 1–1 draw at Vasco da Gama. On 8 January 2020, still owned by Tombense, he moved to Fluminense on loan until the end of the year.

Caio scored his first professional goal on 14 October 2020, netting the opener in a 1–1 away draw against Atlético Mineiro. He subsequently featured regularly for the side, and had his loan extended until the end of 2021 on 2 March of that year.

On 9 September 2021, Caio signed a permanent five-year contract with Flu.

Career statistics

Honours
Avaí
Campeonato Catarinense: 2019

Fluminense
Taça Rio: 2020
Taça Guanabara: 2022, 2023
Campeonato Carioca: 2022

References

External links
 

1998 births
Living people
Footballers from São Paulo
Brazilian footballers
Association football forwards
Campeonato Brasileiro Série A players
Tombense Futebol Clube players
Avaí FC players
Fluminense FC players
São Paulo FC players